Sam Malone is a Cheers character.

Sam Malone may also refer to:

 Sam Malone (politician) (born 1970), Cincinnati city councilmember tried for domestic violence
 Sam Malone (DJ)
 Samantha "Sam" Malone, a Fahrenheit character

See also
 Malone (surname)
 Sam Maloney (disambiguation)
 Sammy Malone, a Casualty character played by Finn Atkins